Plionarctos is an extinct genus of bear endemic to North America from the Miocene to the Pliocene, ~10.3—3.3 Mya, existing for about 7 million years.

Indarctos (10.7—9.2 Mya) preceded Plionarctos by only a few thousand years and was a contemporary of that bear and shared its habitat. Plionarctos preceded and was also contemporary with Tremarctos floridanus (4.9 million — 11,000 years ago) and shared its habitat. Plionarctos is the oldest known genus within the subfamily of the short-faced bears (Tremarctinae), and is believed to be ancestral to the clade.

Fossil distribution
Sites and specimen ages:
Ile de Ratonneau Breccia, Provence, France about ~800,000—100,000 years ago 
Fort Green Mine, Polk County, Florida paleontological sites about 10.3—4.9 Mya
Taunton site, Adams County, Washington (P. harroldorum) about 4.9—1.8 Mya (Plionarctos harroldorum)
Pipe Creek Sinkhole, Grant County, Indiana (P. edensis) about 10.3—1.8 Mya
Palmetto Mine, Polk County, Florida 7.9—7.8 Mya
Gray Fossil Site, Washington County, Tennessee about 7.0-4.5 Mya

References

Pliocene bears
Miocene bears
Pleistocene bears
Pleistocene genus extinctions
Pliocene mammals of North America
Pliocene mammals of Europe
Prehistoric carnivoran genera